Consort Yuan (元妃; 1593–1612) of the Bordered Yellow Banner Niohuru clan, was the wife of Hong Taiji. She was one year his junior. Later literatures have regarded her as Hong Taiji's first wife and primary consort.

Life

Family Background 

 Father: Eidu (額亦都, 1562–1622) was a Manchu officer and a close associate of Nurhaci
 17 brothers 
 Daqi (達啟/达启), Eidu's second son
 Turgei (圖爾格/图尔格，1594–1645), Eidu's eighth son; officer of Manchu armies during the reign of Hong Taiji
 Ebilun (d. 1673), served as one of the Four Regents of the Kangxi Emperor
 5 younger sister
 Wife of Nikan
 Primary consort of Jirgalang, fourth daughter

Wanli era 

In the 21st year of Wanli Emperor reign, Lady Niohuru was born.

It is not known the time when Lady Niohuru married Hong Taiji and became his primary consort.

In the 39th year of Wanli Emperor reign, she gave birth to Lobohoi, Hong Taiji eight son, who would die prematurely in 1617. He didn't receive a posthumous name.

After Hong Taiji become emperor, Lady Niohuru and Lady Ulanara were not named as empresses posthumously.

Titles 

 During the reign of Wanli Emperor (1563–1620)
 Lady Niohuru (from 1593)
 Primary Consort (嫡福晋; from unknown date)
 During the reign of Hong Taiji (r. 1626–1643)
 Consort Yuan  (元妃)

Issue 
As a primary consort:
 Lobohoi (洛博會; 1611–1617), Hong Taiji's third son

See also 

 Ranks of imperial consorts in China#Qing
 Royal and noble ranks of the Qing dynasty

References 

 Manuscripts of Qing History · Biography I"
 "Genealogy of Aisin Gioro" (星源集庆,页二七）
 《满文老档》 第五十一册 天命八年五月......初九日......

1593 births
1612 deaths
16th-century Chinese women
16th-century Chinese people

Consorts of Hong Taiji